Count Michał Jerzy Wandalin Mniszech (1742–1806) was a Polish nobleman.

Michal became Colonel in 1757, Cześnik of the Crown in 1777, Great Secretary of Lithuania in 1778, Chief of the Royal Chancellery in 1780. He served also as Marshal of the Court of Lithuania from 1781 until 1783 and  Grand Marshal of the Crown from 1783 until 1793. He was starost of Lublin, Jawor, Słonim and Rostoki.

As one of the senators he participated in the Great Sejm.

Awards
 Knight of the Order of the White Eagle

Secular senators of the Polish–Lithuanian Commonwealth
1742 births
1806 deaths
Counts of Poland
Targowica confederates
Michal Jerzy
Court Marshals of the Grand Duchy of Lithuania

18th-century Polish–Lithuanian philosophers